The Fresno Memorial Auditorium, at 2425 Fresno St. in Fresno, California, was listed on the National Register of Historic Places in 1994.

It has also been known as Veterans Memorial Auditorium.  It was built during 1935–36 to accommodate a wide range of activities and performances.  To take just one arbitrary example, Tallulah Bankhead performed in The Little Foxes here on January 9, 1941.

It was designed in Moderne and Art Deco style by "Allied Architects of Fresno"; it was built by contractor Trewhitt & Shields Company.

References

1935 establishments in California
Art Deco architecture in California
Auditoriums in the United States
Buildings and structures in Fresno, California
Culture of Fresno, California
Event venues established in 1935
Event venues in California
National Register of Historic Places in Fresno County, California
Moderne architecture in the United States